Lætitia Masson (born 18 August 1966) is a French film director and screenwriter. She has directed twelve films since 1991. Her film À vendre was screened in the Un Certain Regard section at the 1998 Cannes Film Festival.

Early life and education 
Laetitia Masson spent her early years in Nancy, France. Her parents, both teachers, appreciated film. Masson saw her first film by Jean-Luc Godard at the age of seven. Her father was an amateur filmmaker inspired by New Wave cinema, and exposure to this love of film may have contributed to her study of literature and cinema in Paris, before studying as La Fémis film school. There, Masson graduated from the “Départment Image,” in 1991.

Career 
Laetitia Masson has had a prolific film career, directing and writing several short and feature-length films. She has also worked in education and holds a position at La Fémis film school in Paris, France, where she currently directs a 3rd-year workshop. In 2014, Masson was the president of the jury for general and international admissions.

Feature films

En avoir (ou pas) 
Written and Directed by Laetitia Masson, En avoir (ou pas) (1996), her first feature film, was very successful. The film, a production of CLP-Dacia Films and produced by Francois Cuel and Georges Benayoun, follows the story of Alice, a young woman from Boulogne that has just lost her job at the cannery, and Bruno, another lonely heart from Lyon working in construction.

À vendre 
Masson's second feature film, À vendre (1998) is about a woman, France Robert that has disappeared the day of her wedding and the detective that investigates her whereabouts while tracing her life through interviews.

Love Me 
In this film, Love Me (2000), a young woman that escapes her present and past realities in the safety of dreams chases after a singer in search of love. The film is produced by Ciné Valse and stars Sandrine Kiberlain.

La Repentie 
In Masson's 2001 feature film, La Repentie, a woman looking to rebuild her life arrives in a new city, but a stranger man follows her. Masson uses Isabelle Adjani as her femme fatale and incorporates themes of mystery and impulsiveness to illustrate the feeling of starting anew.

Pourquoi (pas) le Brésil 
An adaptation of the book Pourqoui le Brésil by Christine Angot.

Coupable 
An story of unfolding desire, temptation and passion, the maid and the widow are both investigated for the death of Mr. Kaplan.

G.H.B. (Être ou pas être) 
The story of love told from the story of everything, the "story of all stories."

Filmography

Director

Short films 
 Les Petits Bateaux (1988)
 Un Souvenir de soleil (1990)
 Chante de guerre parisien (1991)
 Nulle Part (1993)
 Veritage de l’amour (1994)
 Je suis venue te dire (1997)

Feature Length 
 En avoir (ou pas) (1996)
 À vendre (1998)
 Love Me (2000)
 La Repentie (2001)
 Pourquoi (pas) le Brésil (2004)
 Coupable (2007)
 G.H.B. (Être ou pas être) (2013)
 Un hiver en été (2023)
 Suzanne la pleureuse (TBA)

Television 
 3000 scénarios contre un virus (1994-1995), 1 episode
 Vertige de l’amour (1995)
 L’erotisme ve par… (2001) 1 episode
 Quelle importance (2001)
 X Femmes (2008- ), 1 episode
 Enculées (2008) Season 1, Episode 4
 Petite Fille (2011)
 Aurore (2017), 3 Episodes 
 Requiem (2017) 
 Les fantômes (2017) 
 L’enfance (2017)
 Chevrotine (2022)

Writer 
 Bar des rails (1991), credited as “script girl”
 Chant de guerre parisien (1991)
 Nulle part (1993)
 En avoir (ou pas) (1996)
 Je suis venue te dire (1997)
 À vendre (1998) 
 Love Me (2000)
 La Repentie (2001)
 Pourquoi (pas) le Brésil (2004)
 Coupable (2007)	
 X Femmes (2008- ), 1 episode  
 Enculées (2008) Season 1, Episode 4
 Petite Fille (2011)
 G.H.B. (Être ou pas être) (2013)
 Aurore (2017), 3 Episodes
 Requiem (2017)
 Les fantômes (2017)
 L’enfance (2017)

Actress 
 Les dernières heures du millénaire (1990)
 Normal People Are Nothing Exceptional (1993)
 Souvenir (1996) – Cigarette Girl
 Elie annonce Semoun (2000) - Various characters
 Un grain de beauté (2003) - La sixième comedienne
 Pourquoi (pas) le Brésil 2004) - Elle-même
 X Femmes (2008) Episode: Enculées -  La réalisatrice / The director
 Number One (2017) - Femme Club Olympe

Cinematographer 
 Les surprises du ver à soie (1991)
 Lents que nous sommes (1992)
 La table d'émeraude (1992) 
 Dans ta bouche (2010)

Camera and Electrical Department 
 La Belle Noiseuse (1990), Assistant Camera

Awards 
2018 Winner – Best Director Prize – French Association of Series Critics: Aurore (2017)

Further reading 
 Day, James T. Violence in French and Francophone Literature and Film Amsterdam ;: Rodopi, 2008.
 de Blois, Marco. "L’électidiogramme des émotions / En avoir (ou pas) de Laetitia Masson". 24 images no. 83-84 (1996): 80–80.
 Dobson, Julia. Negotiating the auteur: Dominique Cabrera, Noémie Lvovsky, Laetitia Masson and Marion Vernoux ;: Manchester University Press, 2012.
 Euvrard, Janine. "50 ans de cinéma fraçais au féminin". 24 images no. 82 (1996): 17–17.
 Higbee, Will and Sarah Leahy. Studies in French Cinema: UK Perspectives, 1985-2010;: Intellect Books, 2011.
 Hottell, Ruth A. and Janis L. Pallister. Noteworthy Francophone Women Directors: A Sequel;: Lexington Books, 2011.
 Ince, Kate. The Body and the Screen: Female Subjectivities in Contemporary Women's Cinema;: Bloomsbury, 2017.
 McFadden, Cybelle H. Gendered Frames, Embodied Cameras: Varda, Akerman, Cabrera, Calle, and Maïwenn ;: Rowman & Littlefield, 2014.

References

External links

1966 births
Living people
People from Épinal
French film directors
French women film directors
French women screenwriters
French screenwriters
French television directors
Women television directors